Aga Point is the southernmost point on the main island of Guam. It is located between the villages of Merizo and Inarajan. The only parts of Guam further south are Cocos Island and parts of its surrounding Merizo Barrier Reef.

Geography of Guam